Ministry of Industry and Trade  (Arabic: وزارة  الصناعة والتجارة ) is a cabinet ministry of Yemen.

List of ministers
 Mohamed al-Ashwal (17 December 2020 – present)
 Mohamed Saeed al-Sadi (2014)

See also
 Politics of Yemen

References

Government ministries of Yemen